The Customs Museum is a museum in Kuala Klawang, Jelebu District, Negeri Sembilan, Malaysia, which exhibits facets and lifestyle of the Malaysian people and identity of Negeri Sembilan. It was constructed in 2005 and officially opened on 2 February 2008 by Negeri Sembilan Chief Minister Mohamad Hasan and Minister for Culture, Arts and Heritage Rais Yatim. The museum is housed in a four-story building, with a giant replica of Malay headdress at the top of its entrance and consists of four galleries which are: Introduction of custom, Life cycle, Intellectual tradition, government and power and Pepatih customs.

See also
 List of museums in Malaysia

References

2008 establishments in Malaysia
Jelebu District
Museums established in 2008
Museums in Negeri Sembilan